Praunus is a genus of mysid shrimp, comprising three species:
Praunus flexuosus (Müller, 1776)
Praunus inermis (Rathke, 1843)
Praunus neglectus (G. O. Sars, 1869)
When originally named in 1814 by William Elford Leach, the genus contained P. flexuosus (the type species), and a second species, "P. integer", which is now known as Neomysis integer.

References

Mysida